Roi Et is a town (thesaban mueang) in north-eastern Thailand, capital of Roi Et Province. It covers the whole tambon Nai Mueang of Mueang Roi Et district. As of 2006 it had a population of 34,229. Roi Et is 514 km from Bangkok.

Etymology
The place name Roi Et (ร้อยเอ็ด, literally "one hundred and one") is derived from ร้อย (rɔ́ɔi, "hundred") +‎ เอ็ด (èt, "one"), which in the Thai language carries the archaic and figurative meaning of "many," "a good many," "a great many," or "numerous."

Geography

Main features of the town
At the center of Roi Et lies a lake, next to a 101 meter observation tower that is modeled in the shape of a traditional circular panpipe.

Climate
Roi Et has a tropical savanna climate (Köppen climate classification Aw). Winters are dry and very warm. The monsoon season runs from May through October, with heavy rain and somewhat cooler temperatures during the day, although nights remain warm.

Transportation
Route 214 leads north to Kalasin and south to Kaset Wisai, Surin, and Prasat. Route 2044 leads east to Phon Thong. Route 23 leads west to Maha Sarakham and Ban Phai, and east to Yasothon and Ubon Ratchathani. Route 215 leads south to Suwannaphum and the border with Surin Province. Route 232 is a 4-lane ring road that enables through-traffic to avoid the city centre.

Roi Et is served by Roi Et Airport to the north of the town.

References

External links

Populated places in Roi Et province
Cities and towns in Thailand
Isan